The James C. and Agnes M. Stout House is a historic house in Lake City, Minnesota, United States.  It was built in 1872.  The house was listed on the National Register of Historic Places in 1989 for its local significance in the theme of architecture.  It was nominated for being a leading example of the Carpenter Gothic style, which is fairly rare among Minnesota's housing stock.

See also
 National Register of Historic Places listings in Wabasha County, Minnesota

References

1872 establishments in Minnesota
Carpenter Gothic architecture in Minnesota
Carpenter Gothic houses in the United States
Houses completed in 1872
Houses in Wabasha County, Minnesota
Houses on the National Register of Historic Places in Minnesota
National Register of Historic Places in Wabasha County, Minnesota